Petr Nouza (born 9 September 1998) is a Czech tennis player.

Nouza has a career high ATP singles ranking of 536 achieved on 5 August 2019. He also has a career high doubles ranking of 237 achieved on 14 November 2022.

Nouza has won 1 ATP Challenger doubles title at the 2023 Oeiras Indoors with Victor Vlad Cornea.

Tour titles

Doubles

References

External links
 
 

1998 births
Living people
Czech male tennis players
Sportspeople from Prague